The Aricagua Municipality is one of the 23 municipalities (municipios) that make up the Venezuelan state of Mérida and, according to a 2007 population estimate by the National Institute of Statistics of Venezuela, the municipality had a population of 4,564.  The town of Aricagua is the shire town of the Aricagua Municipality.

Demographics
The Aricagua Municipality, according to a 2007 population estimate by the National Institute of Statistics of Venezuela, had a population of 4,564 (up from 4,514 in 2000). This amounted to 0.5% of the state's population.

Government
The mayor of the Aricagua Municipality is Nelson Jesus Márquez Rojas, re-elected on October 31, 2004, with 59% of the vote.  The municipality is divided into two parishes; Capital Aricagua and San Antonio.

References

External links
 aricagua-merida.gob.ve]  

Municipalities of Mérida (state)